Coalpit Heath is a small village in the parish of Westerleigh, South Gloucestershire, England, south of Yate and east of Frampton Cotterell in South Gloucestershire.

Background

Due to the expansion of Coalpit Heath and the neighbouring villages in the late 20th century, the borders of Coalpit Heath with Frampton Cotterell have become vague. The village contains three Pubs, one post office, a 27-hole golf course The Kendleshire, and a few local shops. The village also includes a parish church, and a local primary school, The Manor CofE VC Primary school.

It was founded as a coal mining settlement. One pit was on Frog Lane at ST 685 815 (to the north east of the village). Other mines operated between Mays Hill and Nibley to the north and at Ram Hill and Henfield to the south.  These were served by a railway line, closed some decades ago and no longer visible on the ground. In 1949 the coal ran out, and since then it has become a sought after place to live, with fields and easy accommodation. The South Gloucestershire Mines Research Group (SGMRG) has done a lot of research into the history of mining in the area. When the Kendleshire golf course was built, the remains of many bell pits were found and there are probably many more in the area.

Frampton Cotterell lies along the northwest border, but the rest of the village is surrounded by the rolling Cotswold countryside, stocked full of wildlife and country pursuits.

St. Saviour's Church lies within the village.  It was designed by William Butterfield in 1844 and was his first Anglican Church.

Amenities used and supported by the village include Bitterwell Lake at Henfield and Coalpit Heath Cricket Club at Ram Hill.

Coalpit Heath in literature

A number of sources, including Frank Barrett's book Where Was Wonderland? A Traveller's Guide to the Settings of Classic Children's Books, cite Coalpit Heath as the setting for the Dick King Smith children's book The Sheep-Pig, later adapted for film as Babe.

The South Gloucestershire Mines Research Group have written two books (more to be published soon) on Coalpit Heath and the surrounding area.  including 'Frog Lane' and 'Kingswood Coal'.

References

External links

Villages in South Gloucestershire District